George Lockhart Rives (May 1, 1849 – August 18, 1917), was an American lawyer, politician, and author who served as United States Assistant Secretary of State from 1887 to 1889.

Early life
Rives was born in New York City on May 1, 1849, to Francis Robert Rives and Matilda Antonia (née Barclay) Rives. His father was the secretary of the American legation at London under U.S. Minister to Great Britain Edward Everett during the William Henry Harrison administration.

Rives was a descendant of the Schuyler, the Van Cortlandt and the Delancey families.  His paternal grandparents were Judith Page (née Walker) Rives, who inherited the Castle Hill plantation in Virginia from her father Francis Walker, and William Cabell Rives, a U.S. Senator and Minister to France who studied law under Thomas Jefferson and was a friend of James Madison.  George's uncle was noted engineer Alfred Landon Rives and his first cousin was author Amélie Rives, who married John Armstrong Chanler (a descendant of John Jacob Astor) and, later, Russian Prince Pierre Troubetzkoy. His maternal grandparents were Louisa Anna Matilda (née Aufrére) Barclay and U.S. Civil War General George Barclay, who owned Carnwath Manor in Wappinger, New York.

He graduated from Columbia College in 1868 with a B.A., and again in 1872 with an A.M.  Also in 1872, he graduated from Trinity College, Cambridge, and then from Columbia Law School in 1873.

Career
Following his graduation from Columbia Law School, he passed the bar and began practicing law in New York City.

In 1887, Rives was appointed Assistant Secretary of State for Latin Affairs by President Grover Cleveland to replace James Davis Porter, serving under U.S. Secretary of State Thomas F. Bayard.  Rives' term as Assistant Secretary of State ended in 1889 after Cleveland's defeat by Benjamin Harrison during the 1888 presidential election.  Rives was succeeded by Boston lawyer William F. Wharton who served under Secretary James G. Blaine.

Following his service in the State Department, he joined the firm of Ohr, Rives & Montgomery.  From 1896 until 1902, he was a member of the New York Rapid Transit Commission and in 1900, he was president of the Commission during its revision of the Greater New York Charter.

From 1902 to 1903, during the administration of New York City Mayor Seth Low, Rives was Corporation Counsel of New York City.

In 1913, he wrote and published the two volume book The United States and Mexico, 1821-1848: A History of the Relations between the Two Countries from the Independence of Mexico to the Close of the War with the United States.

Philanthropy
From 1882 until 1917, Rives was a trustee of his alma mater, Columbia University.  From 1903 to 1917, he succeeded William C. Schermerhorn and served as chairman of the trustees. In 1917, he resigned as trustee and was awarded an honorary Doctor of Laws degree.

Rives also served as president of the New York Public Library, and chairman of the Trustees of the New York Hospital.

Personal life

On May 21, 1873, Rives was married to Caroline Morris Kean (1849–1887).  Caroline, a granddaughter of Peter Philip James Kean and great-granddaughter of Continental Congressman John Kean, was the sister of U.S. Senators John Kean and Hamilton Fish Kean.

 George Barclay Rives (1875–1935), a graduate of St. Paul's School and Princeton University who worked in the U.S. Diplomatic Service as the first secretary of the American Embassy in Vienna, Chargé d'affaires in Brazil, and special assistant to U.S. Ambassador James W. Gerard in Berlin during World War I.  George was married to Gisela Antonia Preinerstorfer (1882–1953).

After his first wife's death, Rives married for the second time to Sarah Swan (née Whiting) Belmont (1861–1924), the daughter of Augustus L. Whiting and Sarah (née Swan) Whiting, on March 20, 1889.  From her first marriage to banker and socialite Oliver Belmont, she was the mother of Natica Caroline Belmont (1883–1908).  After George's marriage to Sarah, he adopted Natica who took the surname Rives.  In 1907, she married William Burden, brother of Arthur Scott Burden and James A. Burden Jr., though she died of asphyxiation in 1908, a few months after the marriage.  Together, George and Sarah were the parents of two additional children:

 Francis Bayard Rives (1890–1969), who married Helen Leigh Hunt (1893–1996), daughter of real estate investor Leigh S. J. Hunt and sister of Henry Leigh Hunt, who was married to Louise Lévêque de Vilmorin.
 Mildred Sara Rives (1893–1927), who married architect Frederick Marquand Godwin (1889–1961) of Cedarmere in Roslyn, New York, in 1917.  Frederick was a cousin of Professor Allan Marquand.  Mildred died in December 1927 giving birth to their only child, Peter Bryant Godwin, who also died during birth.

The Riveses had a city residence at 69 East 79th Street in Manhattan designed by Carrère and Hastings in 1907–1908; a summer home in Newport, Rhode Island; and a country home in Tuxedo Park, New York.  His portrait was painted in 1915 by the Swiss-born American artist Adolfo Müller-Ury (1862–1947) and hangs in the University; another version by the artist belonged to the sitter's family.

Rives died at his summer home in Newport on August 18, 1917.  His widow died at her residence, 907 Fifth Avenue in New York, on May 29, 1924.

References
Notes

Sources

External links

 
Review on The United States and Mexico, 1821-1848
 Guide to the Rives-Barclay Family Papers, 1698-1941 at the Library of Virginia

1849 births
1917 deaths
Schuyler family
American people of Dutch descent
Columbia College (New York) alumni
Columbia Law School alumni
United States Assistant Secretaries of State
American historians
Burials in Rhode Island
Presidents of the New York Public Library
Rives family